Marinko (Cyrillic script: Маринко) is a masculine given name and a surname. It may refer to:

Marinko Čavara (born 1967), politician
Marinko Galič (born 1970), footballer
Marinko Jurendic (born 1977), footballer and coach
Marinko Kekezović (born 1985), handballer
Marinko Koljanin (born 1957), footballer
Marinko Mačkić (born 1983), footballer
Marinko Madžgalj (born 1978), actor
Marinko Magda (born 1963), hitman
Marinko Matosevic (born 1985), tennis player
Marinko Miletić (born 1980), footballer
Marinko Petković (born 1976), footballer
Marinko Rokvić (born 1954), singer
Marinko Stevanović (born 1961), writer
Marinko Šarkezi (born 1972), footballer
Ray Marinko (born 1936), Australian rules footballer
Don Marinko, Jr. (born 1933), Australian rules footballer
Don Marinko, Sr. (1907–1967), Australian rules footballer
Tom Marinko (1941-1981), Australian rules footballer

See also
Marinković

Croatian masculine given names
Serbian masculine given names
Slavic masculine given names